Knight of Shadows is a fantasy novel by American writer Roger Zelazny, published in November 1989. It is the ninth book in the Amber saga.

Merlin continues to attempt to solve the mysteries in his life, in particular understanding why Julia turned against him, how she got involved with Jurt, and the person who is raging against him.

After being trapped in a strange world peopled with ghosts induced by the Pattern, Merlin discovers that he is involved in a superpower quarrel between Amber's  Pattern and the Logrus of Chaos.

In this book, Merlin describes Corwin's voice as "the voice which had once told me a very long story containing multiple versions of an auto accident and a number of genealogical gaffes". The "genealogical gaffes" here refers to a number of inconsistencies in the first series (the Corwin Cycle) regarding the parentage of Corwin's various siblings.

American fantasy novels
The Chronicles of Amber books
1989 American novels
1989 fantasy novels
William Morrow and Company books